Catathyridium jenynsii is a species of sole in the family Achiridae. It was described by Albert Günther in 1862, originally under the genus Solea. It inhabits the Paraná and Uruguay rivers.

References

Pleuronectiformes
Fish described in 1862
Taxa named by Albert Günther